Melinda Lynn Robinson (born February 14, 1980) is a reality TV show personality. Robinson is known for appearing as herself on network shows Take Me Out, King of the Nerds, Millionaire Matchmaker, and appears in the music video "Sexy and I Know It". She has also appeared in the films Abstraction, Pain & Gain, Casting Couch, Mantervention, V/H/S/2, and the comedy The Bet.

She often works with her long–term boyfriend, former UFC heavyweight champion and actor Randy Couture.

Robinson ran in the Republican primary for Nevada's 3rd congressional district in the 2020 election, finishing third. Robinson has promoted various theories on her Twitter account, including QAnon, the Clinton body count conspiracy theory, and a conspiracy regarding Stoneman Douglas High School shooting survivor and gun control activist David Hogg.

Filmography

Film

Television

Web

References

External links
 
 
 

1980 births
Living people
American film actresses
American libertarians
Participants in American reality television series
Nevada Republicans
21st-century American women